Clusia carinata is a species of flowering plant in the family Clusiaceae. It is found only in Peru.

References

carinata
Endemic flora of Peru
Vulnerable plants
Taxonomy articles created by Polbot
Plants described in 1923